The second season of the American television series Gotham, based on characters from DC Comics related to the Batman franchise, revolves around the characters of James "Jim" Gordon and Bruce Wayne. The season is produced by Primrose Hill Productions, DC Entertainment, and Warner Bros. Television, with Bruno Heller, Danny Cannon, John Stephens, and Ken Woodruff serving as executive producers. 

The season was ordered in January 2015 and every cast member from the last season returned with the exception of Victoria Cartagena as Renee Montoya (who would later return for the third season of Batwoman); Andrew Stewart-Jones as Crispus Allen; John Doman as Carmine Falcone; and Jada Pinkett Smith as Fish Mooney, although both Doman and Pinkett Smith returned as guest stars. New additions to the cast include James Frain as Theo Galavan; Jessica Lucas as Tabitha Galavan; and Michael Chiklis as Captain Nathaniel Barnes. Also, Morena Baccarin, Chris Chalk, Drew Powell, and Nicholas D'Agosto were upped to series regulars after having recurred on the previous season. The season was broadcast over 2 runs: the first 11 episodes aired from September to November 2015; and the other 11 episodes aired from February to May 2016. The season also holds two subtitles. The first half of the season is subtitled Rise of the Villains while the second half is subtitled Wrath of the Villains. The season premiered on September 21, 2015 and concluded on May 23, 2016 on Fox.

Premise
Gotham has taken a major turn, with Penguin being the sole crime boss and commissioner Loeb being forced to retire. However, things start going haywire with the arrival of the Galavan family in Gotham; they seek revenge against the Wayne family over one of their ancestors being disgraced. 

In the second half, Professor Hugo Strange has begun experimenting with resurrecting the dead and giving them unnatural abilities.

Cast and characters

Main
 Ben McKenzie as James "Jim" Gordon
 Donal Logue as Harvey Bullock
 David Mazouz as Bruce Wayne 
 Morena Baccarin as Leslie "Lee" Thompkins
 Zabryna Guevara as Sarah Essen
 Sean Pertwee as Alfred Pennyworth
 Robin Lord Taylor as Oswald Cobblepot / Penguin
 Erin Richards as Barbara Kean
 Camren Bicondova as Selina "Cat" Kyle
 Cory Michael Smith as Edward Nygma
 James Frain as Theo Galavan / Azrael
 Jessica Lucas as Tabitha Galavan
 Chris Chalk as Lucius Fox
 Drew Powell as Butch Gilzean
 Nicholas D'Agosto as Harvey Dent
 Michael Chiklis as Nathaniel Barnes

Recurring
 Tonya Pinkins as Ethel Peabody
 B. D. Wong as Hugo Strange
 Ian Quinlan as Carl Pinkney
 Natalie Alyn Lind as Silver St. Cloud
 Melinda Clarke as Grace Van Dahl
 Chelsea Spack as Kristin Kringle
 Michelle Veintimilla as Bridgit Pike / Firefly
 Ron Rifkin as Father Creel
 Nathan Darrow as Victor Fries / Mr. Freeze
 Cameron Monaghan as Jerome Valeska
 Stink Fisher as Aaron Helzinger
 Carol Kane as Gertrude Kapelnut
 Anthony Carrigan as Victor Zsasz
 Richard Kind as Mayor Aubrey James
 Clare Foley as Poison Ivy

Notable guests
 Peter Scolari as Gillian B. Loeb
 Todd Stashwick as Richard Sionis
 James Andrew O'Connor as Tommy Bones
 Maria Thayer as Scottie Mullen
 Mark Margolis as Paul Cicero
 Michael Potts as Sid Bunderslaw
 Raúl Castillo as Eduardo Flamingo
 Michelle Gomez as The Lady
 Tommy Flanagan as Tom "The Knife"
 Kristen Hager as Nora Fries
 Lori Petty as Jeri
 Michael Bowen as Patrick "Matches" Malone
 Paul Reubens as Elijah Van Dahl
 John Doman as Carmine Falcone
 Ned Bellamy as Warden Carlson Grey
 Jada Pinkett Smith as Fish Mooney
 Brian McManamon as Basil Karlo

Episodes

Production
The show was officially renewed by Fox for a 22-episode second season on January 17, 2015.

For this season, the producers decided not to follow the "case-of-the-week" format of most episodes in the first season.

The season saw all series regulars from season 1 returning with the exception of Victoria Cartagena, and Andrew Stewart-Jones. John Doman and Jada Pinkett Smith, who were regulars on season 1, returned to the show in guest star positions. In June 2015, James Frain joined the series as billionaire industrialist Theo Galavan and Jessica Lucas was cast as Tabitha Galavan. Michael Chiklis then joined in July 2015 in the role of Captain Nathaniel Barnes, the GCPD's new captain and Gordon's ally who will one day become his enemy. The show also upgraded Morena Baccarin, Chris Chalk, Drew Powell and Nicholas D'Agosto from recurring or guest roles to series regulars.

The total cost of production for the second season of Gotham was $111 million.

Reception

Ratings

Critical reviews
The second season of Gotham received positive reviews from critics, generally being regarded as an improvement over the first season. On Rotten Tomatoes the season has a rating of 74% based on 15 reviews, with an average rating of 6.58/10. The site's critical consensus reads, "While still tonally uneven in season two, Gotham is back with a renewed focus, moving away from disjointed case-of-the-week plots into a darker, more stable serialized story." Metacritic gives the season a score of 62 out of 100, based on 6 critics, indicating "generally favorable reviews".

References

Gotham (TV series) seasons
2015 American television seasons
2016 American television seasons